Lukas Achtschelling (born 1570) was a landscape painter from Brussels, Belgium.

The Dresdner gallery has owned two small pieces by him, and the St. Michael and Gudula Cathedral three pieces.
He was probably the grandfather of the landscape painter with the same name, Lucas Achtschellinck.

References

1570 births
17th-century deaths
Flemish landscape painters